Colochirus is a genus of sea cucumbers in the family Cucumariidae.

Species
The World Register of Marine Species lists the following species:
Colochirus crassus Ekman, 1918
Colochirus cylindricus Semper, 1867
Colochirus pusillus Helfer, 1912
Colochirus quadrangularis Troschel, 1846
Colochirus robustus Östergren, 1898

References

Cucumariidae
Holothuroidea genera